Vihula Parish was a rural municipality of Estonia, in Lääne-Viru County. It had a population of 1,939 (as of 1 January 2009) and an area of 364.28 km2.

Settlements
There was 1 small borough (Võsu) and 52 villages: Aasumetsa, Adaka, Altja, Andi, Annikvere, Eisma, Eru, Haili, Ilumäe, Joandu, Kakuvälja, Karepa, Karula, Käsmu, Kiva, Koljaku, Koolimäe, Korjuse, Kosta, Lahe, Lauli, Lobi, Metsanurga, Metsiku, Muike, Mustoja, Natturi, Noonu, Oandu, Paasi, Pajuveski, Palmse, Pedassaare, Pihlaspea, Rutja, Sagadi, Sakussaare, Salatse, Tepelvälja, Tidriku, Tiigi, Toolse, Tõugu, Uusküla, Vainupea, Vatku, Vergi, Vihula, Vila, Villandi, Võhma and Võsupere.

Gallery

See also
Rutja Airfield

References

External links